Saxion University of Applied Sciences is a Dutch university of applied sciences with three campuses in the eastern Netherlands. It provides more than 100 courses in study fields as archaeology, finance, law, engineering, hospitality, business, IT, broadcasting, health and digital media. With over 27,000 students, it is one of the largest institutions of higher education in the Netherlands. Saxion offers bachelor & master education and research focused on living technology.

The roots of Saxion University can be traced back to the 1875. A merger of two educational institutions, the Hogeschool Enschede and Hogeschool IJselland, in 1998 paved the way for Saxion University in its present form. This merger enabled Saxion to build further on its strong position in Dutch higher education and since then Saxion University has come to be recognised as an important center of expertise at regional, national and international level.

History 
Saxion is a University of Applied Sciences that originated from the rich educational history of the city of books Deventer and from the social initiatives of enterprising textile traders from Twente. Ever since the 13th century, Deventer has been a bastion of books and knowledge. In the 15th century, Desiderius Erasmus was one of the many students walking the streets of Deventer. Students came from far and near, and Latin was their lingua franca. The Deventer-based Athenaeum Illustre, founded in the 17th century, was a school for academic education. The institution can be regarded as a distant precursor of Saxion.

In the final days of the Athenaeum Illustre, the Twente Industrial and Trade School was founded in Twente in 1864. It was financed by industrialists and traders from the textiles industry. With the founding of schools for secondary technical education, such as the Hogere Textielschool De Maere, technical education in Twente was on the rise. Education in Twente was strongly rooted in society. Entrepreneurs provided financing, took care of the management, recruited lecturers and offered opportunities for internships.

In Deventer as well as in Enschede and Hengelo, the educational offerings expanded considerably after the Second World War. In the sixties and seventies of the last century, many new and diverse degree programmes were initiated and the number of students increased considerably. After a management merger in the Stichting Hogescholen Oost-Nederland (HON) on 1 January 1998, Enschede started developing a city campus.

In the year 2000, the teaching foundation was given a new name. Rijkshogeschool IJselland and Hogeschool Enschede continued together as Saxion. In 2001, the university of applied sciences expanded its educational activities to Apeldoorn. Today, Saxion is a university of applied sciences in the east of the Netherlands where knowledge and technology, stemming from the rich history of the region, are more than ever the foundations for teaching and applied research.

Academies

Schools 

Saxion University of Applied Sciences consists of eleven academies, each representing a different field of specialization and study courses.

Hospitality Business School (HBS)
School of Applied Psychology and Human Resources Management (AMA)
School of Business, Building & Technology (BBT)
School of Commerce & Entrepreneurship (SCE)
School of Creative Technology (ACT)
School of Education (APO)
School of Finance & International Business (FIB)
School of Governance, Law & Urban Development (ABRR)
School of Health (AGZ)
School of Life Science, Engineering & Design (LED)
School of Social Work (AMM)
School of Finance & Accounting (FEM)

Programmes

International Bachelor programmes 
The international bachelor programme consists of eleven study programmes.

 Applied Computer Sciences
 Creative Media and Game Technologies
 Electrical and Electronic Engineering
 Fashion and Textile Technologies
 Hotel Management
 Information and Communication Technology - Software Engineering
 International Business
 International Finance and Accounting
 International Human Resource Management
 Physiotherapy
 Tourism Management

Exchange programmes 
The exchange programme consists of thirty nine study programmes.

 Advanced App Development
 Big Data Technologies
 Biomedical Laboratory Research
 Circular Economy
 Civil Engineering
 Climate and Management
 Cloud Engineering
 Conscious Business
 Creative Design & Technology
 Creative Media and Game Technologies
 Crossing Borders: Global Engagement in Health & Social Work
 Digital Intelligence
 Doing Business with China
 European Project Semester
 Fashion and Textile Technologies
 Global Citizenship
 Hotel Management
 How to Create Killer Content
 Improve Your Business with Data
 Industrial & Sustainable Building
 Innovative Educational Approaches
 Innovative Leadership
 International Business
 International Finance and Accounting
 IT Security
 Legal Skills for European Challenges
 Liberal Arts & Sciences
 Musculoskeletal
 Nanotechnology
 Positive Psychology and Technology
 Risk and Emergency Management
 Robotics and Vision
 Security Management
 Smart Embedded System
 Software Engineering
 Tourism Management
 Urban Development - Public Administration
 Urban Development - Urban and Regional Planning
 Urban Development - Urban Design

International Master programmes 
The international master programme consists of six study programmes.

 Facility and Real Estate Management
 Innovative Textile Development
 Master of Arts in Management (MA)
 Master of Business Administration (MBA)
 Master of Science in Applied Nanotechnology
 Master Robotics System Engineering

Locations 
Saxion University of Applied Sciences has three campuses in the East of the Netherlands - one campus in each of the three Dutch cities of Deventer, Enschede and Apeldoorn. Thanks to the important contribution of agriculture to the local economy, this region is renowned for its beautiful countryside and fairly relaxed pace of life. However, all four Saxion locations have good public transport facilities, meaning that the hustle and bustle of the major cities of Amsterdam, Rotterdam, Utrecht and The Hague is no more than 1½ hours away.

Enschede 

The campus in Enschede is the first real 'City Campus' in the Netherlands. Characteristic to the building are the pavilions, which lodge different types of education. The campus does not consist of just classrooms, but also of working spaces for individuals or study groups, the so-called ‘study landscape’. The campus is a 5 minutes walk from the city town, so after class student easily can find a study spot in the centre or have a drink with friends. Saxion has housing accommodations in Enschede for all of first year international students from outside EU/EEA. After the first year, student can search for a room or studio in an (international) student accommodation.

Deventer 
The Saxion campus in Deventer is located in the centre and at walking distance from the train station. The striking architecture, designed by the Dutch architect Paul Dirks and the special location, a few minutes from the old town, the city centre and the arts centre, are all ingredients that make this an exceptional learning environment.

Apeldoorn 
Apeldoorn houses Saxion's smallest campus. This modern building is located in the city centre, convenient next to the train station. The catering of the campus is partly provided by Hotel Management students to practise, creating an international gastronomy feeling. The students also have their own wine bar, where they learn all the ins and outs about winetasting and dining.

International students 
The university has more than 27,000 students over the three campuses, with more than 3,500 international students from 89 different nationalities. The number of students has been growing ever since the founding of the university in 1998.

Saxion helps students build their international future offering support not only from an academic point of view but also in terms of one's personal development. After their graduation students can apply for the Connect Programme, which offers talented graduates trainings, workshops and Dutch lessons free of charge.

In the end of 2016 Saxion launched the platform IntoSaxion to support prospective students getting in touch with other Saxion students and experiencing what it's like to study in the Netherlands.

References 

https://ibs.saxion.nl

External links 
 

Vocational universities in the Netherlands
1998 establishments in the Netherlands
Buildings and structures in Apeldoorn
Buildings and structures in Deventer
Buildings and structures in Enschede
Organisations based in Gelderland
Education in Gelderland